Milan Dale Smith Jr. (born May 19, 1942) is an American attorney and jurist serving as a United States circuit judge of the United States Court of Appeals for the Ninth Circuit. Smith's brother, Gordon H. Smith, was a Republican U.S. Senator from 1997 to 2009. Milan Smith is neither a Republican nor a Democrat.

Early life and education 
Smith was born in Pendleton, Oregon. He is the son of Milan D. Smith Sr., who served on the staff of Secretary of Agriculture Ezra Taft Benson. Smith received a Bachelor of Arts degree from Brigham Young University in 1966. Smith attended The University of Chicago Law School on a full-tuition scholarship, from which he graduated in 1969 with a Juris Doctor.

Career 
After law school, Smith became an associate attorney at the Los Angeles firm of O'Melveny & Myers.
In 1972, Smith left O'Melveny to co-found his own law firm, Smith & Hilbig, which eventually became Smith, Crane, Robinson & Parker. He was a President-General Counsel of the Los Angeles State Building Authority from 1983 to 2006. Smith was a Vice Chairman of the California Fair Employment and Housing Commission from 1987 to 1991.

Judicial Appointment 
Smith was nominated by President George W. Bush on February 14, 2006 to fill a seat vacated by Judge A. Wallace Tashima. He was rated well qualified by the American Bar Association. He was confirmed just over three months later by the United States Senate on May 16, 2006 by a 93–0 vote. He was the fifth judge appointed to the Ninth Circuit by Bush, and the first since Carlos Bea was confirmed in 2003. He received his commission on May 18, 2006. In 2022, Smith told the Deseret News that he has no plans to retire and wishes to "die with my boots on."

Notable cases
Smith has been one of the Ninth Circuit's most prolific writers. According to one periodical, he authored the most majority opinions of any judge on the Ninth Circuit in the three-year period ending on May 10, 2013.

Constitutional law

First Amendment 

  Smith wrote the majority opinion, which struck down the Stolen Valor Act of 2005. The panel ruled 2 to 1 that the law violated the First Amendment. "The right to speak and write whatever one chooses—including, to some degree, worthless, offensive and demonstrable untruths—without cowering in fear of a powerful government is, in our view, an essential component of the protection afforded by the First Amendment," Smith wrote in the majority opinion. The U.S. Supreme Court affirmed the judgment in a 6–3 decision.
  Smith, writing for the majority of an 11-judge en banc panel, concluded that an ordinance of the City of Redondo Beach, California that barred day laborers from soliciting work from occupants of motor vehicles violated the Free Speech Clause of the First Amendment.
  Smith, writing for the majority, held that a photojournalist might have a First Amendment right to observe wild horse "gathers"—rounding up and removing excess horses—on federal government land. Quoting both James Madison and the theme song to Mister Ed, the opinion remanded the case back to the district court to analyze the photojournalist's claim under Press-Enterprise Co. v. Superior Court, 464 U.S. 501 (1984), to determine whether horse gathers had historically been open to the press and public, and whether such access plays a significant positive role in the process.
  Smith, writing for a divided panel, rejected an effort by contributors to California's anti-gay marriage ballot measure, Proposition 8, to shield their identities from disclosure. The opinion rejected a Free Speech Clause challenge to the California requirement that committees report donations made before the election but after the pre-election reporting deadline, and that certain other aspects of the donors' challenges were either moot or not ripe because the information the donors sought to keep confidential had already been published across the internet.
  Smith, writing for a unanimous panel, concluded that a tattoo artist had standing to bring a facial and an as-applied First Amendment challenge to a city zoning ordinance that restricted the artist's ability to open and operate a tattoo shop.
  Writing on behalf of a unanimous court, Smith held that a high school football coach spoke as a public employee when he would kneel and pray on the 50-yard line immediately after games, in full school apparel, while in view of students and parents. The coach had a professional responsibility, the court reasoned, to communicate demonstratively to students and spectators, which he used to press his particular views upon observers. Because the coach's demonstrative conduct was made in his capacity as a public employee, the school did not illegally retaliate against him when the school ordered the coach not to speak in the manner that he did. In a special concurrence, Smith noted that the school district's action also was justified in order to avoid violating the Establishment Clause. Certiorari was granted in the case on January 14, 2022.
 Calvary Chapel Dayton Valley v. Sisolak (9th Cir. 2020). Smith, writing for a unanimous panel, reversed the district court’s denial of Calvary Chapel’s motion to enjoin the enforcement of Nevada’s COVID-19 restrictions on religious worship services.  Relying on the recent Supreme Court case, Roman Catholic Diocese v. Cuomo (2020), Smith concluded that Nevada’s disparate treatment of religious worship services triggered strict scrutiny review, and although slowing the spread of COVID-19 was a compelling interest, the restrictions were not narrowly tailored to serve that interest.
 Tandon v. Newsom (9th Cir. 2021). Smith was a member of a panel hearing a case regarding California's limitation on gatherings to three households due to the COVID-19 pandemic. The plaintiffs, who wished to hold in-person prayer meetings, argued that the California regulation violated their 1st amendment rights to free practice of religion. Smith was a member of the 2-1 majority ruling against the plaintiffs. The Supreme Court reversed 10 days later.
 Herring Networks v. Maddow (9th Cir. 2021). Smith dismissed a defamation lawsuit against Rachel Maddow. He ruled that Maddow's words that OAN “really literally is paid Russian propaganda" could not amount to defamation and that her speech is protected by the First Amendment.

Second Amendment 

  Smith, writing for a unanimous three-judge panel, upheld a conviction for the possession of a homemade machine gun. Rejecting the defendant's Second Amendment claim based on District of Columbia v. Heller, 554 U.S. 570 (2008), Smith wrote that machine guns are "dangerous and unusual weapons" that are not "typically possessed by law-abiding citizens for lawful purposes," and that their possession is not protected by the Second Amendment.

Fourth Amendment and police excessive force cases 

  Smith, writing for the majority of a three-judge panel, concluded that a California law requiring police officers to collect DNA samples from adults arrested for felonies did not violate the Fourth Amendment. After the Ninth Circuit elected to rehear the case en banc, the U.S. Supreme Court held in Maryland v. King, 569 U.S. 435 (2013), that a Maryland law requiring the collection of DNA samples from arrestees charged with "serious crimes" was constitutional. Thereafter, a majority of the 11-judge en banc panel refused to bar implementation of the California law without deciding whether the statute might be unconstitutional as applied to at least some arrestees. In a concurring opinion, Smith maintained that the California law is "materially indistinguishable from the Maryland law" and therefore concluded that "[t]his case is over, and the district court has no obligation to give the Plaintiffs an opportunity to amend their complaint." Judge Charles Breyer in the Northern District of California stayed the case "pending final resolution of state law" in light of the California Court of Appeal's decision in People v. Buza, 231 Cal. App. 4th 1446 (2014), which held the statute unconstitutional on state law grounds. In 2018, the California Supreme Court in People v. Buza, Cal. 5th 658 (2018), reversed the California Court of Appeal's decision, holding that the DNA collection was lawful as part of the normal booking procedure for individuals validly arrested for a serious offense.
  Smith authored the majority opinion affirming the denial of summary judgment based on qualified immunity, where a deputy sheriff fatally shot a 13-year-old boy. Viewing the facts in the light most favorable to the plaintiffs, the panel concluded that the deputy deployed deadly force within seconds after exiting his vehicle while the boy was walking in the opposite direction on an adjacent sidewalk, holding what appeared to be a gun pointed at the ground, without warning about the amount of force that would be used, and without observing any aggressive behavior by the boy. Because the boy did not pose an immediate threat to law enforcement officials or anyone else, the law clearly established that the deputy's conduct was unconstitutional and the deputy was not entitled to qualified immunity. On June 25, 2018, the U.S. Supreme Court denied cert.

Separation of powers and federalism 

  Smith, writing for a unanimous panel, largely upheld a district court's denial of the federal government's motion to enjoin California's sanctuary state laws, including SB 54, the California Values Act. The panel mostly rejected the government's intergovernmental immunity and preemption arguments, concluding instead that the Tenth Amendment's anticommandeering doctrine precluded the government's attempt to force state and local officials to assist with immigration enforcement efforts. The panel concluded, "SB 54 may well frustrate the federal government's immigration enforcement efforts. However, whatever the wisdom of the underlying policy adopted by California, that frustration is permissible, because California has the right, pursuant to the anticommandeering rule, to refrain from assisting with federal efforts." On June 15, 2020, the U.S. Supreme Court denied cert.
 In re U.S. Department of Education (9th Cir. 2022). In a 2-1 decision, Smith partially granted a petition for a writ of mandamus brought by former Secretary of Education Elisabeth DeVos after a federal district judge ordered former Secretary DeVos to sit for a deposition in a lawsuit about denying student-loan relief. Smith denied Devos's request for a transfer to the Southern District of Florida, but wrote that the district court clearly erred by requiring DeVos to sit for a deposition in light of her status as the former Secretary of Education and the lack of any showing that her testimony was necessary to resolving the case. Smith's opinion was joined by Judge Jacqueline Nguyen. Judge Richard Paez dissented, noting that DeVos was no longer in office, and arguing that for this reason, forcing her to sit for a short deposition would not significantly distract from any official duties.

Death penalty 

 McGill v. Shinn (9th Cir. 2021). Smith dissented when the 9th circuit permitted Arizona to execute someone despite the fact that Arizona's death penalty statute at the time was declared unconstitutional by the Supreme Court in Ring v. Arizona. Although Arizona updated its death penalty statute afterwards, Smith argued that the execution violates the ex post facto clause.

Copyright law 

  Smith wrote the majority opinion for a divided panel, which upheld a jury verdict finding that the 2013 song "Blurred Lines" infringed on Marvin Gaye's estate's copyright to the 1977 song "Got To Give It Up." The decision rested on narrow grounds based on the procedural posture of the case.

Environmental law 

  Smith wrote a concurrence described as "unusually blunt and wide-ranging," in which he criticized the court for "taking the law too far and causing much of 'the decimation of the logging industry in the Pacific Northwest' and the loss of legions of timber jobs." Smith's view prevailed when the case was reviewed en banc, with Smith writing the opinion for the unanimous 11-judge panel.
  Smith dissented from an en banc decision of the court holding that a federal agency's decision to refrain from acting triggered the Endangered Species Act's interagency consultation process. The dissent began with a reproduction of a woodcut and excerpt from Jonathan Swift's Gulliver's Travels, depicting and describing the eponymous traveler's capture by the Lilliputians—an unusual sight in the Federal Reporter. In addition to criticizing the majority opinion in the case, the dissent criticized other recent Ninth Circuit decisions as lacking a basis in the law, two of which—Decker v. Northwest Environmental Defense Center, 133 S. Ct. 1326 (2013), and U.S. Forest Service v. Pacific Rivers Council, 133 S. Ct. 2843 (2013)—were later overturned by the U.S. Supreme Court.
  Smith wrote an opinion for a unanimous panel concluding that pollution exceedances detected at monitoring stations of the County of Los Angeles and the Los Angeles County Flood Control District were sufficient to establish the County's liability under the Clean Water Act. The U.S. Supreme Court declined to review the opinion.
  Smith wrote for a unanimous panel that environmental organizations lacked standing to challenge regulators' failure to define greenhouse gas emissions limits because the nexus between the harm and the desired regulation was too attenuated, in part because there was no evidence that the desired limitations would curb a significant amount of greenhouse gas emissions.

Immigration 

 Gonzales v. Barr (9th Cir. 2020). Smith ruled in a 2-1 decision that aliens who have been detained for six months or more must be granted bond hearings. The majority rejected the government's argument that it could deny bond hearings, explaining that the bond hearings must be granted under existing precedent.
 Dawson v. Garland (9th Cir. 2021). Smith dissented in a 2-1 decision where the majority denied relief to Karlena Dawson, a refugee from Jamaica. Smith would have granted relief because "Post issuance of the protection order, the physical abuse Dawson suffered may have diminished, but Hinds remained obsessively fixated on stalking her, hurting her, and even killing her, which by themselves constitute torture."

Labor, employment, and antitrust 

  Smith, writing for a divided panel, held that the Federal Arbitration Act did not preempt California's rule that barred waiver of representative claims under its Private Attorneys General Act (PAGA). Smith held that a California employee bringing an action under PAGA does so as a proxy for the state's labor law enforcement agencies; that, "[a]s the California Supreme Court has explained, a PAGA action is a form of qui tam action"; and that "[t]he FAA was not intended to preclude states from authorizing qui tam actions to enforce state law."
  Smith, on behalf of a unanimous panel, affirmed in part and reversed in part the district court's dismissal of an action challenging, on antitrust and labor law grounds, a Seattle ordinance authorizing a collective-bargaining process between ridesharing companies, such as Uber and Lyft, and independent contractors working as for-hire drivers. The panel concluded that the city was not entitled to state action immunity from the Sherman Antitrust Act because the ordinance permitted price-fixing of ride-referral service fees by the city. The panel also concluded that the National Labor Relations Act did not preempt the ordinance.
 Alston v. NCAA (9th Cir. 2020). Smith authored a concurring opinion in which he largely joined the majority's finding that rules implemented by the National Collegiate Athletic Association capping the amount of grant-in-aid that student-athletes are permitted to receive from their school as part of an athletic scholarship was in violation of antitrust law as an illegal restraint of trade. Smith wrote separately to argue that the majority's use of cross-market analysis to assign a procompetitive benefit to benefit of the NCAA's amateurism restrictions in developing a separate and distinct market for amateur college sports was against the legislative purpose of the Sherman Antitrust Act. Writing that the treatment of student-athletes "is the result of a cartel of buyers acting in concert to artificially depress the price that sellers could otherwise receive for their services"—exactly the "sort of distortion" that the antitrust laws were designed to prohibit—Smith argued that the majority's analysis "seems to erode the very protections a Sherman Act plaintiff has the right to enforce" by limiting the extent of the relief afforded to student-athletes despite their being "quite clearly deprived of the fair value of their services."

Other notable cases 
  On remand from the U.S. Supreme Court, Smith authored an opinion on behalf of a unanimous en banc panel that vacated the district court's judgment in favor of an employer and its benefits plan administrator on claims of breach of fiduciary duty in the selection and retention of certain mutual funds for a benefit plan governed by ERISA. Smith reasoned that federal law imposes on fiduciaries an ongoing duty to monitor investments, even absent a change in circumstances. Looking to the law of trusts, the duty of prudence requires fiduciaries to reevaluate investments periodically and to take into account their power to obtain favorable investment products, particularly when those products were substantially identical—other than their lower cost—to products they had already selected.
  Smith, writing for a unanimous three-judge panel and in a matter of first impression before the circuit courts, interpreted the Anti-Terrorism Act's proximate causation requirement for individuals seeking to bring civil actions. Plaintiffs, on behalf of family members who were killed by an ISIS attack while serving as government contractors in Jordan, argued that their injury was caused "by reason of" Twitter's material support of ISIS, because ISIS-affiliated individuals used Twitter. Applying the U.S. Supreme Court's analysis of statutes with similar language, Smith held that a plaintiff must show at least some direct relationship between the injuries that he or she suffered and the defendant's acts. Because plaintiffs failed to plead a connection between Twitter's provision of accounts to ISIS and the deaths of the government contractors, the panel dismissed their claims.
  Writing for a 2-1 majority, Smith vacated an arbitration award issued to Monster Energy after an arbitrator failed to disclose his ownership interest in JAMS, the alternative dispute resolution provider that had administered the arbitration. The panel explained that because the arbitrator's ownership interest in JAMS was sufficiently substantial, and because JAMS repeatedly arbitrated matters involving Monster Energy, the relationship should have been disclosed based on the U.S. Supreme Court's holding that vacatur of an arbitration award is supported where the arbitrator fails to "disclose to the parties any dealings that might create an impression of possible bias." On June 29, 2020, the U.S. Supreme Court denied cert.

See also
Udall family
Lee-Hamblin family

References

External links 

U.S. Department of Justice Profile
Fotouhi, David, "From Worst to First?: Judge Smith Describes Improving the Ninth Circuit," Harvard Law Record, April 24, 2008.
"Senate approves Smith's brother for federal appeals court," The Associated Press, May 17, 2006
"White House Looks at Two Names for Ninth Circuit," The Recorder, November 9, 2005

1942 births
21st-century American judges
American Latter Day Saints
Brigham Young University alumni
Judges of the United States Court of Appeals for the Ninth Circuit
Living people
People from Pendleton, Oregon
Udall family
United States court of appeals judges appointed by George W. Bush
University of Chicago Law School alumni